The 1993–94 Cypriot First Division was the 55th season of the Cypriot top-level football league. Apollon Limassol won their 2nd title.

Format
Fourteen teams participated in the 1993–94 Cypriot First Division. All teams played against each other twice, once at their home and once away. The team with the most points at the end of the season crowned champions. The last three teams were relegated to the 1994–95 Cypriot Second Division. The 11th-placed team faced the 2nd-placed team of the 1993–94 Cypriot Second Division, in a two-legged relegation play-off for one spot in the 1994–95 Cypriot First Division.

Apollon Limassol did not have a good enough average (Points per matches) in European Competitions over the previous five seasons (1989-90 until 1993-94) and therefore they were not allowed to enter the 1994–95 UEFA Champions League. As a result of this they had to enter the 1994–95 UEFA Cup alongside the second placed team of the league, Anorthosis Famagusta.

Point system
Teams received three points for a win, one point for a draw and zero points for a loss.

Changes from previous season
Aris Limassol and APOP were relegated from previous season and played in the 1993–94 Cypriot Second Division. They were replaced by the first two teams of the 1992–93 Cypriot Second Division, Omonia Aradippou and APEP.

Stadia and locations

League standings

Results

Relegation play-off
The 11th-placed team Olympiakos Nicosia faced the 2nd-placed team of the 1993–94 Cypriot Second Division APOP Paphos, in a two-legged play-off for one spot in the 1994–95 Cypriot First Division. Olympiakos won both matches and secured their place in the 1994–95 Cypriot First Division.

APOP 2–3 Olympiakos
Olympiakos 2–0 APOP

See also
 Cypriot First Division
 1993–94 Cypriot Cup
 List of top goalscorers in Cypriot First Division by season
 Cypriot football clubs in European competitions

References

Sources

Cypriot First Division seasons
Cyprus
1993–94 in Cypriot football